Preeti Desai is a British actress, supermodel, and former Miss Great Britain. She made history by becoming the first woman of Indian descent to win the title in 2006.

Desai made her acting debut with acclaimed film Shor in the City (2011) and was nominated for Best Lead Actress at the South Asian Rising Star Film Awards in New York City in October 2012.
Desai is listed as the Times of India's 50 Most Desirable Women and People Magazine's 50 Most Beautiful People in 2011.

Early life
Desai was born in Middlesbrough, North Yorkshire, England to Hemlata (née Niak) and Jitendra, who have a pyrotechnics company. Both of her parents are of Gujarati descent; her father is from Kenya and her mother is from Uganda. Her younger sibling Anjlee Desai, is a singer and songwriter.

Desai attended St Augustine's RC Primary School in Coulby Newham, then to Nunthorpe Secondary school in Nunthorpe, and Middlesbrough College.

Career

Miss Great Britain (2006–2007)
Desai was crowned Miss Cleveland and then went on to win Miss Great Britain in 2006. As a British Indian, she was the first woman of Indian heritage to win the title. She was crowned Miss Great Britain after the previous winner was disqualified and the country voted her to take over as the winner.

Desai moved to London from the North East of England to carry out her role as ambassador of Miss Great Britain.

Desai supported organisations like Mind and Carers Week, which took her to 10 Downing Street to have tea with then Prime Minister Gordon Brown to highlight the work of the charities, and to the Houses of Parliament to get MPs to team up with her in support of Carers Week.

Modelling
Desai moved to Mumbai in 2008 to start her career as a fashion model. Being represented by ace photographer Atul Kasbekar, she appeared on the cover of L'officiel magazine with super star Shahrukh Khan as her 1st assignment. That assignment was followed right away with her 2nd assignment: the Kingfisher Calendar 2008. Desai was also selected to be solely on the cover of the Kingfisher Calendar special edition.

In the same year, Desai appeared on the October cover of Cosmopolitan magazine. Desai soon became a favourite in the Indian fashion industry and walked for many famous designers and fashion weeks and appeared on more magazine covers.

In October 2009, Desai was announced as the new face of the retail apparel company Provogue along with Indian actor Hrithik Roshan. Desai was also featured with Italian designer Leonardo Ferragamo of Salvatore Ferragamo for L'Officiel magazine and walked for fashion designer Christopher Kane in a Fashion Week.

Desai got herself a super model status in India in a short span of two years before she started acting for her first feature film in 2011.

Film debut (2011)
Desai made her film debut in a feature film Shor in the City which was released in April 2011. It is directed by Raj Nidimoru and D. K.Krishna, and is produced by Balaji Telefilms' Ekta Kapoor. Desai plays the role of the female protagonist Sharmili opposite Indian-American actor Sendhil Ramamurthy. The film is a thriller drama, set in contemporary Mumbai with three separate but interrelated storylines, of which one is in English and the other two are in Hindi.

The film and Desai's performance got rave reviews by critics and audience alike with an average star rating of 4, stating Desai had great screen presence.

Desai was nominated for Best Lead Actress at the South Asian Rising Star Film Awards in New York in October 2012 presented by SAIFF and HBO. Shor in the City was officially selected for the Pusan International Film Festival and the Dubai International Film Festival in 2011. The film won the Best Director Award at MIAAC in New York.

In 2014, Desai was seen in the lead role opposite Abhay Deol for the feature film titled One by Two directed by Devika Bhagat and produced by Amit Kapoor.

In 2017, Desai played the role of Jen Green in the thriller The Bachelor Next Door directed by Michael Feifer. The film starred Michael Welch, Tyler Johnson, and Haylie Duff. Her other work includes The Work Wife on Amazon Prime, where she played the role of Katie, and Saving My Baby on Lifetime.

In 2019, Desai shot for the comedy pilot series Woman Up written and directed by Zoe Lister-Jones for ABC and 20th Century Fox Television. The series features Mary Elizabeth Ellis and Tawny Newsome as her co-stars.

Desai stars in Damien Chazelle's 2020 The Stunt Double produced and distributed by Apple Cinematography by Linus Sandgren Composer original music by Lorne Balfe.

Public image
Desai was listed as one of Time's 50 Most Desirable Women and People magazine's 50 Most Beautiful People in 2011.
 
Esquire magazine featured Desai as 'A Woman we love' and wrote "The first thing you notice about Preeti Desai are her slinky long legs, model physique and huge doe-like brown eyes. Then she opens her mouth and a strong Northern English accent burst out – a nostalgic flashback reminiscent of the old Boddingtons adverts that featured glamorous, sophisticated women but, humorously, with pronounced Manchester accents. The down-to-earth naughty humoured breath of fresh air walk's in and preambles."

Top Indian designer Anita Dongre known for never using showstoppers in her runway shows, for the first time in August 2012 asked Desai to close the show at fashion week. Questioning Dongre on why she wanted Desai to don the final piece, Anita Dongre said "I saw no one else but Preeti in my showstopper design, she makes all my designs look beautiful, and she has the right elegance, confidence and poise."

Filmography

References

External links
 

Living people
Actors from Middlesbrough
English female models
English film actresses
British female models
British film actresses
English people of Gujarati descent
British actresses of Indian descent
English Hindus
English expatriates in India
Actresses in Hindi cinema
British expatriate actresses in India
European actresses in India
English beauty pageant winners
21st-century English actresses
21st-century British actresses
Year of birth missing (living people)